Paweł Sękowski (born 2 October 1985) is a Polish historian specializing in modern history, researcher at the Jagiellonian University, President of the Kuźnica Association from January 2018.

Biography 
In 2009 he graduated from history studies at the Jagiellonian University. He was a scholarship holder of the Socrates-Erasmus program at the Université Jean Moulin Lyon 3 (2007–2008) and a scholarship holder of the Government of the French Republic (2010–2012).

In 2015, he obtained the degree of doctor of humanities upon the thesis on Polish emigration in France between 1944–1949, supervised by Wojciech Rojek and Oivier Forcade. He defended his thesis in French at the Sorbonne, and in Polish at the Jagiellonian University.

His research interests include the social and political history of Poland and France in the 20th century, the history and sociology of immigration, and the history of refugees.

He is a member of the Polish Historical Society, Groupe interdisciplinaire de recherché Allemagne-France and the Global Studies Research Network.

In 2018, he was elected the President of the Kuźnica Association, replacing Andrzej Kurz in this position. From 2018, he also acts as the vice-chairman of the Polish Teachers' Union at the Jagiellonian University.

Works 
 Polskie  Stronnictwo  Ludowe  w  Krakowie  i  powiecie krakowskim  w  latach  1945–1949, Instytut Pamięci Narodowej, 2011;
 Les  Polonais  en  France  au  lendemain  de  la  Seconde  Guerre  mondiale  (1944–1949). Histoire d’une intégration, Sorbonne Université Presses, 2019;
 Imigranci polscy we Francji, 1939–1949: Historia integracji społeczności osiadłej przed drugą wojną światową we Francji, Wydawnictwo Instytutu Pamięci Narodowej, 2019.

Source.

Awards 
 First Award in the Władysław Pobóg-Malinowski Competition for the best historical debut (masters thesis) awarded by the Institute of History of the Polish Academy of Sciences and the Institute of National Remembrance, 2010;
 Distinction in the Władysław Pobóg-Malinowski Competition for the best historical debut (doctoral thesis) awarded by the Institute of History of the Polish Academy of Sciences and the Institute of National Remembrance, 2016.

References 

1985 births
Living people
Jagiellonian University alumni
Academic staff of Jagiellonian University
Writers from Lublin
21st-century Polish historians
Polish male non-fiction writers